In aviation, the maneuvering speed of an aircraft is an airspeed limitation selected by the designer of the aircraft.  At speeds close to, and faster than, the maneuvering speed, full deflection of any flight control surface should not be attempted because of the risk of damage to the aircraft structure.

The maneuvering speed of an aircraft is shown on a cockpit placard and in the aircraft's flight manual but is not commonly shown on the aircraft's airspeed indicator.

In the context of air combat maneuvering (ACM), the maneuvering speed is also known as corner speed or cornering speed.

Implications

It has been widely misunderstood that flight below maneuvering speed will provide total protection from structural failure. In response to the destruction of American Airlines Flight 587, a CFR Final Rule was issued clarifying that "flying at or below the design maneuvering speed does not allow a pilot to make multiple large control inputs in one airplane axis or single full control inputs in more than one airplane axis at a time". Such actions "may result in structural failures at any speed, including below the maneuvering speed."

Design maneuvering speed VA
VA is the design maneuvering speed and is a calibrated airspeed.

If  is chosen by the manufacturer to be exactly  the aircraft will stall in a nose-up pitching maneuver before the structure is subjected to its limiting aerodynamic load.

The maneuvering speed or maximum operating maneuvering speed depicted on a cockpit placard is calculated for the maximum weight of the aircraft.  Some Pilot's Operating Handbooks also present safe speeds for weights less than the maximum.

Maximum operating maneuvering speed VO
Some aircraft have a maximum operating maneuvering speed VO. Note that this is a different concept than design maneuvering speed. The concept of maximum operating maneuvering speed was introduced to the US type-certification standards for light aircraft in 1993.

See also 
 V speeds
 American Airlines Flight 587

References

External links 
  "Design airspeeds"

Airspeed
Aerodynamics